Balabanovo is the name of several inhabited localities in Russia and a village in Bulgaria (Balabanovo, Bulgaria).

Modern localities
Urban localities
Balabanovo, Kaluga Oblast, a town in Borovsky District of Kaluga Oblast

Rural localities
Balabanovo, Moscow Oblast, a village under the administrative jurisdiction of Sofrino Work Settlement in Pushkinsky District of Moscow Oblast

Abolished localities
Balabanovo, Kirov Oblast, a village in Kichminsky Rural Okrug of Sovetsky District in Kirov Oblast; abolished in July 2012;